The Stanhope Medal or Stanhope Gold Medal is an international award given annually by the United Kingdom's Royal Humane Society for the most courageous and heroic rescue that was made in the previous year. It is named in memory of British Royal Navy officer Chandos Scudamore Scudamore Stanhope, who performed several life-saving events during his lifetime.

Background
The "Stanhope Medal" is named after British Royal Navy officer Chandos Scudamore Scudamore Stanhope (1823–1871). He served as a naval officer mate from November 1842 after he passed his officer's exam. He was promoted to lieutenant in March 1846. Stanhope was also a personal assistant to First Lord of the Admiralty Hugh Childers. Stanhope became a captain in August 1858. He commanded  from Rio de Janeiro to Singapore in 1867.

Stanhope received a Royal Humane Society Silver Medal in 1851 for the rescue of a drowning seaman. He died from smallpox in 1871 when he was 48 years old. Soon after his death a group of his friends formed a memorial in his honour and raised four hundred poundsa large sum at the timefor the issuance of a yearly gold medal honoring a courageous rescue. They gave the money to the Royal Humane Society on the terms that any interest the money earned would be for a periodic gold medal to be given for the greatest gallantry of a hero of the previous year. It is called the "Stanhope Medal."

Description
The Royal Humane Society issues the Stanhope Medal as the highest of several heroism awards. The award is presented annually for the most gallant rescue of the previous twelve months. The first gold medal was awarded to Matthew Webb for an attempt to rescue a man drowning in the Atlantic Ocean in 1873. From 1962, several societies began nominating rescues for the award, including the Liverpool Shipwreck and Humane Society and the Humane Societies in Australia, Canada, and New Zealand. In five years1959, 1960, 1961, 1969, and 1973 no medal was awarded as no rescue was deemed sufficiently worthy during the previous 12 months, while on three occasions2001, 2002 and 2019 the standard for the award was met by two nominees and both received the medal. There have been two posthumous awards, in 1956 and in 2018.

The obverse shows a boy blowing at an extinguished torch with the inscription Lateat Scintillvia Forsan, which means "a small spark may perhaps lie hid", the motto of the Royal Humane Society. The reverse has a wreath and a suitable inscription. The medal was suspended from a distinctive plaque-shaped bar, embossed with the date of award and the words STANHOPE MEDAL until about 1936, when this was replaced with ornamental style suspender. Originally of 18-carat gold, this was changed to 9-carat in 1942. Apart from the metal, the medal is now identical to the Royal Humane Society's bronze and silver awards.

Although not an official award, the medal can be worn on the right chest in uniform by members of the British armed forces.

Notable recipients
The standard for the award of the Stanhope Gold Medal has been met by the following notable recipients for the years designated. 
Captain Matthew Webb (1873)
Robert Archibald James Montgomerie (1877)
Edmund Fremantle (1880)
Willoughby Baynes Huddleston (1891)
Wilfred Tomkinson (1913)
Evelyn Irons (1935) – first woman recipient
Richard Stanton (2019)
John Volanthen (2019)

References

Sources 

  
  
  
 

Royal charities of the United Kingdom
Organizations established in 1871
Lifesaving organizations
Awards established in 1873
1873 establishments in the United Kingdom